Leila Negra, the stage name of Marie Nejar (born March 20, 1930), is an Afro-German singer and actress. She began her career as a child film actor in the 1940s, became a singer after World War II, and left performing in the late 1950s to become a nurse.

Family and early childhood
She was born Marie Nejar in Mülheim an der Ruhr, Germany. Her father was a black sailor out of Liverpool, England, who originally came from Ghana; he saw his daughter only a few times. Her mother, Cécilie, was the daughter of a white German woman and a creole man from the island of Martinique. Cécilie was initially disowned by her family on account of her interracial relationship. She concealed her pregnancy from her family and placed Marie in an orphanage when she was born. When Marie was three years old, Cécilie removed her from the orphanage and they moved to Hamburg to be near Cécilie's mother, with whom Cécilie had reconciled. Cécilie, who worked as a musician, bled to death following an abortion when Marie was 10 years old and Marie was then cared for by her maternal grandmother.

Marie grew up in the Hamburg docklands neighbourhood of St. Pauli. When the National Socialists came to power, she was exposed to hostility because of her dark skin. Due to the Nuremberg Race Laws of 1935, she was unable to finish her education and instead had to do forced labour in a factory. By her own account, she survived the early years of Nazism with the help of sympathetic people in her community, including some of the local policemen; later her appearances in Nazi propaganda films offered some protection.

Career as performer
Her film career as a performer began as a result of a search instigated by Joseph Goebbels, the German Minister of Propaganda, for black children who could play African natives in various films being made by UFA, which had been taken over by the Nazis in 1933. Nejar first appeared in the 1943 fantasy film Münchhausen, performing as a black servant with a fan. Only 12 years old when the film was shot, she didn't realize it was propaganda and was happy to have two weeks off from school and earn some money. After that, she had a small role in the comedy Quax in Africa (produced in 1943/44 and released in 1947) as the daughter of an African tribal chief. After the war, she performed in films as a singer rather than an actor, including Dancing Stars (1952), Salto Mortale (1953), The Sweetest Fruits (1954), and Der Schweigende Engel (1954).

During the post-war years, she worked at a bar in the winter and as a cigarette girl at a resort in the summer. Asked to test a microphone one evening for other performers, she impressed the audience and the musicians with her talent and started a career as a singer. It was at this time that she adopted the stage name Leila Negra. Even though she was already 20, when she got a contract with a record company, she was promoted as a "15-year-old child" star. Over the next decade, she had a number of hit songs, including the title song from the 1952 film Toxi, which was about the first wave of children born to black Allied servicemen and white German mothers. She was the first to record the Gerhard Winkler song "Mütterlein" (English equivalent: Mommy), which subsequently became a hit for both Frankie Laine and David Whitfield with English lyrics under the title "Answer Me, My Love". She toured with the well-known Austrian singer Peter Alexander, as well as with other musicians.

In her mid-twenties, after a career spanning half a dozen films and some 30 songs, she withdrew from performing as Leila Negra. In 1957, she began training as a nurse, which became her career for the remainder of her working life.

In 2007, she published her autobiography, Mach nicht so traurige Augen, weil du ein Negerlein bist: Meine Jugend im Dritten Reich (Don't look so sad, because you are a little Negro: my youth in the Third Reich). The title is taken from one of her hit songs of the 1950s. As of 2015, she was retired and still living in Hamburg.

See also 

 Afro-Germans
 Theodor Wonja Michael
 Hans Massaquoi

References

Further reading
Nejar, Marie. Mach nicht so traurige Augen, weil du ein Negerlein bist: Meine Jugend im Dritten Reich (Do Not Look So Sad Because You Are a Little Negro: My Youth in the Third Reich). With Regina Carstensen. Rowohlt,  2007. .

External links
 Interview with Marie Nejar on YouTube
 

1930 births
German film actresses
20th-century German women singers
20th-century German actresses
Living people
German people of Ghanaian descent
German people of Martiniquais descent